Kowloon Peak, also known as Fei Ngo Shan (literally: "Soaring Goose Mountain"), is a  tall mountain in the northeast corner of New Kowloon, Hong Kong, situated in Ma On Shan Country Park. It is the tallest mountain in Kowloon, and is crossed by both the Wilson Trail and the MacLehose Trail. On the lower slopes of Tung Yeung Shan about 1.1 miles (1.7 kilometres) to the north is the Gilwell Campsite, belonging to The Scout Association.

Hiking and access 
There are several paths from Jat's Incline and Fei Ngo Shan Road that lead to the summit. One of Hong Kong's most treacherous and dangerous climbs is the rock climb from Clear Water Bay Road to Kowloon Peak's summit through Suicide Cliff.

Suicide Cliff is not necessarily a place where people commit suicide, but it is such named most likely because the climb is so treacherous, it is akin to committing suicide. The hike has also seen numerous injuries and fatalities.  In one instance, two mainland Chinese tourists ran into trouble on Kowloon Peak's Suicide Cliff and caused an extensive rescue operation involving 160 firefighters.

For casual hikers, choosing the easiest path to the summit through Fei Ngo Shan Road is recommendable.

See also 
List of mountains, peaks and hills in Hong Kong
Eight Mountains of Kowloon

References

Mountains, peaks and hills of Hong Kong
New Kowloon
Sai Kung District
Wong Tai Sin District